Francisco Martínez Anglada (born 6 March 1995), commonly known as Xiscu, is a Spanish footballer who plays for CD Don Benito mainly as a left winger.

Club career
Born in Ciutadella de Menorca, Balearic Islands, Xiscu represented CD Menorca and CD Atlético Baleares as a youth. On 9 June 2014 he joined Tercera División side CE Mercadal, scoring 15 goals during his debut campaign.

On 13 June 2015 Xiscu signed for Real Zaragoza, being assigned to the reserves also in the fourth level. On 13 November of the following year he made his professional debut, coming on as a late substitute for Juan Muñoz in a 2–0 home win against CD Mirandés in the Segunda División.

On 30 July 2017, Xiscu joined Real Murcia of the Segunda División B.

References

External links

1995 births
Living people
People from Ciutadella de Menorca
Footballers from Menorca
Spanish footballers
Association football wingers
Segunda División players
Segunda División B players
Tercera División players
CD Atlético Baleares footballers
Real Zaragoza B players
Real Zaragoza players
Real Murcia players
CF Villanovense players
Atlético Malagueño players
CD Don Benito players